Andreas's racer (Dolichophis andreanus) is a species of snake in the family Colubridae. The species is native to the Middle East.

Etymology
The specific name, andreanus, is in honor of "Herr Prof. Andreas " (Professor Andreas) who collected natural history specimens in Persia (now Iran) in 1905.

Geographic range
D. andreanus is found in the southern Zagros Mountains and their foothills, in Fars Province, Iran, and in Iraq.

Habitat

Reproduction
D. andreanus is oviparous.

References

Further reading
Auer M, Khudur FA, Araratm A, Hussein RH, Auer S, Zönnchen F (2016). "First record of Heirophis andreanus from Iraq". Sauria 38 (4): 49–51.
Sindaco R, Jeremčenko VK, Venchi A, Grieco C (2013). The Reptiles of the Western Palearctic, Volume 2: Annotated Checklist and Distributional Atlas of the Snakes of Europe, North Africa, Middle East and Central Asia, with an Update to Volume 1. (Monographs of the Societas Herpetologica Italica). Latina, Italy: Edizioni Belvedere. 543 pp. .
Torki F (2010). "Die Andreas-Zornatter Heirophis andreanus (WERNER, 1917) im Westen des Iran ". Sauria 32 (4): 27–32. (in German).
Werner F (1917). "Reptilien aus Persien (Provinz Fars) ". Verhandlungen der kaiserlich-königlichen zoologisch-botanischen Gesellschaft in Wien 67: 191–220. (Zamenis andreana, new species, pp. 207–208). (in German).

Reptiles described in 1917
Reptiles of Iran
Dolichophis
Taxobox binomials not recognized by IUCN